Agh Bolagh-e Sofla (also Romanized as Āgh Bolāgh-e Soflá; also known as Āgh Bolāgh-e Pā’īn and Āq Bolāgh-e Pā’īn) is a village in Arshaq-e Markazi Rural District, Arshaq District, Meshgin Shahr County, Ardabil Province, Iran. At the 2006 census, its population was 54, in 11 families.

References 

Towns and villages in Meshgin Shahr County